WMT may refer to:

NYSE stock ticker for Walmart
Zunyi Maotai Airport, IATA code WMT
Warsaw mean time
WMT (AM), an AM radio station (600 kHz) in Cedar Rapids, Iowa, United States
KOSY-FM, an FM radio station (95.7 MHz) in Anamosa, Iowa, United States branded as "WMT-FM" and simulcasting WMT (AM)
KKSY-FM, an FM radio station (96.5 MHz) in Cedar Rapids, Iowa, United States, which held the call sign WMT-FM from 1963 to 2012
KGAN, a television station (channel 2 analog/29 digital) licensed to Cedar Rapids, Iowa, United States, which held the call sign WMT-TV from 1953 to 1981
West Midlands Trains, a train operator in England
World Masterpiece Theater, a series of anime series